Oleg Parada (born 5 February 1969) is a former Russian football player who played for various professional and amateur clubs.

References

1969 births
Living people
Soviet footballers
FC Chernomorets Novorossiysk players
Russian footballers
FC Kuban Krasnodar players
Russian Premier League players
Association football forwards